The 2013 Carolina Challenge Cup was the 10th staging of the tournament. The tournament began on February 16 and concluded on February 23.

D.C. United were the three-time defending champions of the preseason tournament, but did not participate in this year's edition of the cup.

Chicago Fire has won the 2013 Carolina Challenge Cup.  It was the club's first title.

Teams
Four clubs competed in the tournament:

Standings

Matches

Scorers

See also 
 Carolina Challenge Cup
 Charleston Battery
 2013 in American soccer

References 

2013
2013 in American soccer
2013 in sports in South Carolina
February 2013 sports events in the United States